Alexander Dang (born 12 February 1990) is a Norwegian footballer who plays as a forward.

Career
Born in Bergen, Norway, Dang began his career with club Vadmyra and Hovding before joining Sotra SK.

In 2015 season, he scored 44 goals for Sotra and finish the season as the top scorer in the Norwegian Third Division.

After just over two year with Sotra, Dang signed for Norwegian Second Division club Nest-Sotra. He scored his first goals for the club in his first appearance, scoring the opener of a 1–1 draw against Egersunds on 14 April 2017. Dang finished the season with 21 league goals as Nest-Sotra were promoted to the 2018 Norwegian First Division.

Personal life
Dang was born in Norway to a Vietnamese father and Norwegian mother.  His Vietnamese name is Đặng Xuân Trường.

Honours
Individual
Norwegian Third Division Top goalscorer: 2015
Norwegian Second Division Top goalscorer: 2017

References

External links

Alexander Dang at Norwegian Football Federation

1990 births
Living people
Norwegian people of Vietnamese descent
Norwegian footballers
Association football forwards
FK Jerv players
Nest-Sotra Fotball players
Egersunds IK players